Echinopsis is a large genus of cacti native to South America, sometimes known as hedgehog cactus, sea-urchin cactus or Easter lily cactus. One small species, E. chamaecereus, is known as the peanut cactus. The 128 species range from large and treelike types to small globose cacti. The name derives from echinos hedgehog or sea urchin, and opsis appearance, a reference to these plants' dense coverings of spines.

They are remarkable for the great size, length of tube, and beauty of their flowers, which, borne upon generally small and dumpy stems, appear much larger and more attractive than would be expected.

Taxonomy 
Studies in the 1970s and 1980s resulted in several formerly separate genera being absorbed into Echinopsis:

Some have proposed merging Rebutia as well.

Like several other taxonomic changes in Cactaceae, this one has not been universally accepted. Amateur and professional growers still use
names like Echinopsis (in the older sense), Lobivia, Setiechinopsis and Trichocereus, although many of the others listed above fell out of common usage long before the change.

Changing the genus name necessitated using some different specific epithets to avoid creating duplicate names. Thus both Echinopsis bridgesii and Trichocereus bridgesii previously existed. These are very different plants: Echinopsis bridgesii is a short clumping cactus, whereas Trichocereus bridgesii is a tall columnar cactus similar to E. (or T.) pachanoi. Under the new classification, Trichocereus bridgesii becomes Echinopsis lageniformis.

The genus name Trichocereus was given to a number of columnar cacti in 1909 by Vincenzo Riccobono, before the genus was subsumed—along with Lobivia—into Echinopsis in 1974 by Friedrich. A 2012 genetic and morphological study by Albesiano found Trichocereus to be monophyletic if it included three species of Harrisia.

A 2012 genetic analysis of chloroplast DNA indicates Echinopsis is made up of several divergent lineages. E. spachiana was not included in the study but is thought to be related to a Helianthocereus clade.

Soehrensia Backeb. was found to be a separate genus, with synonym Helianthocereus Backeb.

Species 
Note: some of the species listed below may be synonyms, subspecies, or varieties of others.

 Echinopsis adolfofriedrichii G. Moser

 Echinopsis amoenissima Werdermann 
 Echinopsis ancistrophora Spegazzini
 Echinopsis antezanae (Cárdenas) H. Friedrich & G. D. Rowley
 Echinopsis apiculata Linke 
 Echinopsis arachnacantha (Buining & F. Ritter) H.Friedrich
 Echinopsis arebaloi Cárdenas
 Echinopsis atacamensis (Philippi) H. Friedrich & G.D. Rowley
 
 Echinopsis aurata Salm-Dyck 
 Echinopsis aurea Britton & Rose
 
 Echinopsis backebergii Werdermann
 Echinopsis baldiana Spegazzini
 Echinopsis berlingii Y. Ito 
 Echinopsis bertramiana (Backeberg) H. Friedrich & G. D. Rowley

 Echinopsis bolligeriana Mächler & Helmut Walter 
 Echinopsis bonnieae (Halda, Hogan & Janeba) Halda & Malina 
 Echinopsis boyuibensis F. Ritter
 Echinopsis brasilensis A. V. Frič

 Echinopsis bridgesii Salm-Dyck (not to be confused with E. lageniformis, which is also known as Trichocereus bridgesii)
 Echinopsis cabrerae (R. Kiesling) G. D. Rowley

 Echinopsis caineana (Cárdenas) D. R. Hunt
 Echinopsis cajasensis F. Ritter
 Echinopsis calliantholilacina Cárdenas
 Echinopsis callichroma Cárdenas
 Echinopsis calochlora K. Schumann

 Echinopsis campylacantha Pfeiffer & Otto 

 Echinopsis cardenasiana (Rausch) H. Friedrich

 Echinopsis cephalomacrostibas (Werdermann & Backeberg) H. Friedrich & G. D. Rowley
 Echinopsis cerdana Cárdenas

 Echinopsis chalaensis (Rauh & Backeberg) H. Friedrich & G. D. Rowley
 Echinopsis chamaecereus H. Friedrich & W. Glaetzle
 Echinopsis chereauniana Schlumb. 
 Echinopsis chiloensis (Colla) H. Friedrich & G. D. Rowley

 Echinopsis chrysantha Werdermann
 Echinopsis chrysochete Werdermann
 Echinopsis cinnabarina (Hooker) Labouret
 Echinopsis clavata (F. Ritter) D. R. Hunt
 Echinopsis cochabambensis Backeberg
 Echinopsis colmariensis Hort. 
 Echinopsis comarapana Cárdenas
 Echinopsis conaconensis (Cárdenas) H. Friedrich & G. D. Rowley
 Echinopsis coquimbana (Molina) H. Friedrich & G. D. Rowley

 Echinopsis coronata Cárdenas
 Echinopsis cotacajesii Cárdenas

 Echinopsis crassicaulis (R. Kiesling) H. Friedrich & Glaetzle
 Echinopsis cristata Salm-Dyck 
 Echinopsis cuzcoensis (Britton & Rose) H. Friedrich & G. D. Rowley
 Echinopsis cylindracea (Backeberg) Friedrich
 Echinopsis decaisniana Walp. 

 Echinopsis densispina Werdermann
 Echinopsis derenbergii A. V. Frič
 Echinopsis deserticola (Werdermann) H. Friedrich & G. D. Rowley

 Echinopsis escayachensis (Cárdenas) H. Friedrich & G. D. Rowley
 Echinopsis eyriesii Pfeiffer & Otto
 Echinopsis fabrisii (R.Kiesling) G. D. Rowley

 Echinopsis famatimensis (Spegazzini) Werdermann
 Echinopsis ferox (Britton & Rose) Backeberg

 Echinopsis friedrichii G. D. Rowley

 Echinopsis gibbosa Pfeiffer 
 Echinopsis gigantea Rud. Meyer 
 Echinopsis gladispina Y. Ito 
 Echinopsis glauca (F. Ritter) H. Friedrich & G. D. Rowley
 Echinopsis glaucina H. Friedrich & G. D. Rowley

 Echinopsis haematantha (Spegazzini) J. G. Lamb.

 Echinopsis hamatispina Werdermann 
 Echinopsis hammerschmidii Cárdenas

 Echinopsis hertrichiana (Backeberg) D. R. Hunt

 Echinopsis hossei Werdermann 

 Echinopsis huotti Labour.

 Echinopsis hystrichoides F. Ritter
 Echinopsis ibicuatensis Cárdenas
 Echinopsis imperialis Hort. 

 Echinopsis jajoiana Hort. 
 Echinopsis jamessianus Hort. 

 Echinopsis kladiwaiana Rausch

 Echinopsis klingleriana Cárdenas
 Echinopsis knotti Schlumberger 
 Echinopsis knuthiana (Backeberg) H. Friedrich & G. D. Rowley
 Echinopsis korethroides Werdermann

 Echinopsis lageniformis (Forst.) H. Friedrich & G. D. Rowley (formerly Trichocereus bridgesii)
 Echinopsis lamprochlora F. A. C. Weber
 Echinopsis lateritia Gürke

 Echinopsis leucantha Walpers

 Echinopsis litoralis (Johow) H. Friedrich & G. D. Rowley (syn.: E.chiloensis (Colla) subsp. litoralis (Johow)Lowry)

 Echinopsis lorethroides Werdermann 
 Echinopsis macrodiscus Frič 
 Echinopsis macrogona (S.D.) H. Friedrich & G. D. Rowley
 Echinopsis mamillosa Gürke

 Echinopsis marsoneri Werdermann
 Echinopsis mataranensis Cárdenas
 Echinopsis maximiliana Heyder
 Echinopsis melanacantha A. Dietr. 

 Echinopsis meyeri Heese
 Echinopsis mieckleyi Rud. Meyer
 Echinopsis mihanovichii Frič & Gurcke 
 Echinopsis minuana Spegazzini

 Echinopsis mirabilis Spegazzini
 Echinopsis misleyi J. Labouret 

 Echinopsis molesta Spegazzini

 Echinopsis nigra Backeberg

 Echinopsis nigrispina Walp. 
 Echinopsis nodosa Linke 
 Echinopsis obrepanda (Salm-Dyck) K. Schum.
 Echinopsis octacantha Muehlenpf. 

 Echinopsis oxygona Pfeiff. & Otto
 Echinopsis pachanoi (Britton & Rose) H. Friedrich & G. D. Rowley
 Echinopsis pampana (Britton & Rose) D. R. Hunt

 Echinopsis pectinata Fennel 

 Echinopsis pelecygona Y. Ito 

 Echinopsis pentlandii (W. J. Hooker) Salm-Dyck ex A. Dietrich

 Echinopsis peruviana (Britton & Rose) H. Friedrich & G. D. Rowley

 Echinopsis picta Walp. 

 Echinopsis pojoensis Cárdenas

 Echinopsis pseudomammillosa Cárdenas

 Echinopsis pugionacantha Rose & F. Boedeker
 Echinopsis pulchella Zucc. 

 Echinopsis reichenbachiana Pfeiff. 

 Echinopsis rhodotricha K. Schumann

 Echinopsis riviere-de-caraltii Cárdenas

 Echinopsis robinsoniana Werdermann 

 Echinopsis rubescens Backeberg 

 Echinopsis salmiana F. A. C. Weber 
 Echinopsis salpigophara A. C. Lemaire 
 Echinopsis saltensis Spegazzini
 Echinopsis sanguiniflora (Backeberg) D. R. Hunt
 Echinopsis santaensis (Rauh & Backeberg) H. Friedrich & G. D. Rowley

 Echinopsis schelhasii Pfeiff. & Otto 
 Echinopsis schickendantzii F. A. C. Weber
 Echinopsis schieliana (Backeberg) D. R. Hunt
 Echinopsis schoenii (Rauh & Backeberg) H. Friedrich & G. D. Rowley
 Echinopsis schreiteri (Castellanos) Werdermann

 Echinopsis scopa Carrière 

 Echinopsis scopulicola (F. Ritter) R. Mottram
 Echinopsis setosa Linke 

 
 Echinopsis silvestrii Spegazzini
 Echinopsis simplex Niedl 
 Echinopsis skottsbergii (Backeberg) H. Friedrich & G. D. Rowley

 Echinopsis spegazzinii K. Schumann 
 Echinopsis sphacelata Gravis 
 Echinopsis spinibarbis (Otto) A. E. Hoffmann

 Echinopsis strausii Graessn. 

 Echinopsis subdenudata Cárdenas
 Echinopsis sucrensis Cárdenas
 Echinopsis tacaquirensis (Vaupel) H. Friedrich & G. D. Rowley
 Echinopsis tacuarembense J. Arechavaleta 

 Echinopsis taratensis (Cárdenas) H. Friedrich & G. D. Rowley

 Echinopsis tarmaensis (Rauh & Backeberg) H. Friedrich & G. D. Rowley
 Echinopsis tegeleriana (Backeberg) D. R. Hunt
 Echinopsis tephracantha Hort. 
 Echinopsis terscheckii (A. A. Parmentier) H. Friedrich & G. D. Rowley

 Echinopsis thionantha (Spegazzini) D. R. Hunt
 Echinopsis tiegeliana (Wessner) D. R. Hunt

 Echinopsis trichosa (Cárdenas) H. Friedrich & G. D. Rowley
 Echinopsis tricolor A. G. Dietrich 
 Echinopsis tuberculata Niedt 
 Echinopsis tubiflora J. G. Zuccarini
 Echinopsis tucumanensis Y. Ito 
 Echinopsis tulhuayacensis (Ochoa) H. Friedrich & G. D. Rowley
 Echinopsis tunariensis (Cárdenas) H. Friedrich & G. D. Rowley

 Echinopsis uyupampensis (Backeberg) H. Friedrich & G. D. Rowley

 Echinopsis vatteri (R. Kiesling) G. D. Rowley 
 Echinopsis verschaffeltii Hort. 

 Echinopsis werdermannii Frič

 Echinopsis yuquina D. R. Hunt
 Echinopsis zuccarinii Pfeiff. & Otto 

Many hybrids exist, mostly between similar species but also between more distinct ones, such as the cross between E. pachanoi and E. eyriesii which was sold under the name "Trichopsis pachaniesii" by Sacred Succulents.

Distribution
Echinopsis species are native to South America (Argentina, Chile, Bolivia, Peru, Brazil, Ecuador, Paraguay and Uruguay). They grow only in situations where the soil is sandy or gravelly, or on the sides of hills in the crevices of rocks.

Cultivation
The growing and resting seasons for Echinopsis are the same as for Echinocactus. Research by J. Smith (former Curator at the Royal Botanic Gardens, Kew) showed that species like the Chilean Echinopsis cristata and its Mexican relatives thrive if potted in light loam, with a little leaf mould and a few nodules of limestone. The limestone keeps the soil open; it is important that the soil should be well drained. In spring, the plants should receive the full influence of the increasing warmth of the sun; and during hot weather, they will be benefited by frequent spraying overhead, which should be done in the evening. The soil should never be saturated, as the soft fibrous roots will rot if kept wet for any length of time.

None of the species need to be grafted to grow freely and remain healthy, as the stems are all robust enough and of sufficient size to take care of themselves. The only danger is in keeping the plants too moist in winter, for although a little water now and again keeps the stems fresh and green, it deprives them of that rest which is essential to the development of their large, beautiful flowers in summer.

Gallery

References

Bibliography
 Edward F. Anderson, The Cactus Family (Timber Press, 2001) , pp. 255–286
 K. Trout, Trout's Notes on San Pedro & related Trichocereus species (Sacred Cacti 3rd ed. Part B) (Moksha Press, 2005)

External links

 Cactus Culture for Amateurs by W. Watson (1889)
 SucculentCity:  Plant Profiles, Photographs & Cultivation Data
 Kuentz: Echinopsis (in French)
 Lohmueller: Echinopsis
 Mattslandscape; Echinopsis hybrids-growing culture
 Vimeo Video Echinopsis Cacti in Bloom
 echinopsis.com Photographs, Videos
 Echinopsis Cacti Flower Photographs, Videos

 
Cacti of South America
Cactoideae genera
Articles containing video clips